Iridopsis fragilaria is a species of geometrid moth in the family Geometridae. It is found in Central America, North America, and Oceania.

The MONA or Hodges number for Iridopsis fragilaria is 6585.

References

Further reading

 

Boarmiini
Articles created by Qbugbot
Moths described in 1909